19 Aurigae is a single star located approximately 3,800 light years away from the Sun in the northern constellation Auriga. It is visible to the naked eye as a faint, white-hued star with an apparent visual magnitude of 5.05. The star is moving closer to the Earth with a heliocentric radial velocity of 4.3 km/s.

This is an evolved A-type bright giant star with a stellar classification of A5 II+. It is a variable star of unknown type that ranges in magnitude from 5.03 down to 5.09. This star is an estimated 36 million years old with a projected rotational velocity of 8 km/s. It has 8 times the mass of the Sun and about 15 times the Sun's radius. 19 Aurigae is radiating 7,057 times the total luminosity of the Sun from its photosphere at an effective temperature of 8,300 K.

References

External links
 HR 1740
 Image 19 Aurigae
 

A-type bright giants
Auriga (constellation)
Durchmusterung objects
Aurigae, 19
034578
024879
1740
Suspected variables